Omprakash Raje Nimbalkar is a Shiv Sena (Uddhav Balasaheb Thackeray) politician from Osmanabad district, Marathwada. He is member of 17th Lok Sabha from Osmanabad constituency. He was Member of the Legislative Assembly from Osmanabad Vidhan Sabha constituency of Osmanabad District, Maharashtra, India as a member of Shiv Sena.

Positions held
 2009: Elected to Maharashtra Legislative Assembly
 2019: Elected to 17th Lok Sabha

See also
 Osmanabad Taluka

References

External links
 Shivsena Home Page

Living people
Shiv Sena politicians
Maharashtra MLAs 2009–2014
People from Osmanabad district
Marathi politicians
1984 births